In the manufacture of electronic printed circuit boards, flying probes are used for testing both bare circuit boards and boards loaded with components. Flying probes were introduced in the late 1980’s. Flying probes can be found in many manufacturing and assembly operations. A flying probe tester uses one or more test probes to make contact with the circuit board under test; the probes are moved from place to place on the circuit board to carry out tests of multiple conductors or components. Flying probe testers are an alternative to bed of nails testers, which use multiple contacts to simultaneously contact the board and which rely on electrical switching to carry out measurements. 

One limitation in flying probe test methods is the speed at which measurements can be taken; the probes must be moved to each new test site on the board, and then a measurement must be completed.  Bed-of-nails testers touch each test point simultaneously and electronic switching of instruments between test pins is more rapid than movement of probes.

Bare board 

Flying probes are used to test bare boards because of their lower cost compared with other methods.  Although fixture testing (bed of nails) is still required due to customer and industry requirements, the use of flying probe for electrical test is quite appealing. Flying probes do not require fixtures, and programs can be created quickly to support single image, array and full panels.  They can test family or multi-part panels.In addition to continuity and shorts, they can provide buried resistive testing, HiPot (Dielectric Breakdown Testing) and 4-Wire Kelvin (precision low resistance testing) specific to plating integrity.

Along with the cost benefit on investment, there are also advantages in programming. As no fixture is required, changes to a circuit board or panel does not require the cost of re-drilling fixtures and dedicated time on costly drilling equipment. Program changes can be done quickly and many times will not require the job to be pulled from the machine. Test reports can be provided for each board tested as well as serialization when required. This has become an important requirement with many customer and industry specifications.

As with fixture testers, automation is available for flying probes as well. In higher volume operations this allows for “lights out” operation. The machines can communicate with ERP systems, police maintenance and calibration records and provide full traceability to product processed. With the importance of “Time to Market” Flying Probes have enhanced the competitive variable as lost time due to retooling has been removed. Prototype and Quick Turn product is the perfect match for Flying Probes as they excel in low quantity orders and are quick to change jobs, unlike the long setup times with fixture testers.

Loaded board in-circuit test 

In the testing of printed circuit boards, a flying probe test or fixtureless in-circuit test (FICT) system may be used for testing low to mid volume production, prototypes, and  boards that present accessibility problems. A traditional "bed of nails" tester for testing a PCB requires a custom fixture to hold the PCBA and the Pogo pins which make contact with the PCBA. In contrast, FICT uses two or more flying probes, which may be moved based on software instruction. The flying probes are electro-mechanically controlled to access components on printed circuit assemblies (PCAs). The probes are moved around the board under test using an automatically operated two-axis system, and one or more test probes contact components of the board or test points on the printed circuit board.

Flying probe testing is commonly used for test of analog components, analog signature analysis, and short/open circuits. They can be classified as in-circuit test (ICT) systems or as Manufacturing Defects Analyzers (MDAs). They provide an alternative to the bed-of-nails technique for contacting the components on printed circuit boards. The precision movement can probe points on integrated circuit packages without expensive fixturing or programming required.

The main advantage of flying probe testing is the substantial cost of a bed-of-nails fixture, costing on the order of US $20,000, is not required. The flying probes also allow easy modification of the test fixture when the PCBA design changes. FICT may be used on both bare or assembled PCB's.  However, since the tester makes measurements serially, instead of making many measurements at once, the test cycle may become much longer than for a bed-of-nails fixture.  A test cycle that may take 30 seconds on such a system, may take an hour with flying probes. Test coverage may not be as comprehensive as a bed of nails tester (assuming similar net access for each), because fewer points are tested at one time. 
However, net access for traditional bed of nails testing is proving more challenging as board designs become more complex and compact. This often tilts the balance in favour of Flying Probe testing since these can use targets as small as 80um or 3.2mils for net access.

Increasingly flying probe systems add other tests for "one stop" testing of circuit boards. Options such as laser test (used initially for board planarity correction, but now used for such tests as BGA planarity, no-fit component verification and component alignment testing) and automated optical inspection are now common. Flying probe systems can also be combined with bed of nails access on key nets (such as power supply nets) to add powered tests such as Boundary Scan, device programming and even full functional test capability.

Uses 
 4-wire Kelvin measurements
 Analog component testing
 Analog signature analysis
 ATE diagnostics
 Bare board test
 Boundary scan testing
 Flash programming
 Functional test
 Low Value Component testing
 New Product Introduction
 Open/short detection
 Optical Inspection
 Power-off testing
 Power-on testing

Benefits of fixtureless in-circuit test
Automatic optical inspection for presence of components, correct polarity, and letters or numbers on ICs. 
Value measurements on resistors, capacitors, Zener diodes and inductors. 
IC open circuit checker finds lifted legs and dry joints on ICs. 
Can test fine pitch printed circuit boards down to 0.3 mm with a repeatable accuracy of probe placement of ±0.05mm. 
Test program is rapidly prepared from printed circuit board CAD data. 
All major CAD platforms support FICT.

References

Hardware testing
Electronic test equipment
Nondestructive testing